Moydrum Castle ( meaning "plain of the ridge") is a ruined castle situated in the locality of Moydrum, Ireland, just to the east of Athlone. The property is privately owned.

Background
The lands of Moydrum were granted to the Handcock family, originally from Devon in England, during the Cromwellian plantations of Ireland in the 17th century.  From then on the family remained one of the most prominent landowning dynasties and landlords in the area. Moving forward several generations, head of family William Handcock served as a Member of Parliament (MP) in Grattan's Parliament, representing Athlone until the parliament’s dissolution following the Acts of Union 1800 with the United Kingdom.  Handcock had originally been an opponent of the Act, but was promised a peerage should he vote in favour of it. He duly succumbed and finally, in 1812, Handcock was created 1st Baron Castlemaine. The Baron decided to create an appropriate stately home on his lands at Moydrum, and therefore asked architect Richard Morrison to remodel and enlarge an existing house belonging to the family there, built 1750.  The resulting gothic-revivalist castle was completed in 1814 and was described as a "handsome residence" in Samuel Lewis' 1837 Topographical Dictionary Of Ireland, "a solid castellated mansion with square turrets at each angle, beautifully situated by a small lake, and surrounded by an extensive and richly wooded demesne".

By the 1880s, and the time of the 4th Baron, the Barony of Moydrum comprised .

Yachting
The Lords Castlemaine were prominent members of Lough Ree Yacht Club which is currently located at Ballyglass, Hillquarter, Athlone. Major G.S. Handcock was Hon. Secretary of Lough Ree Yacht Club and was appointed in 1920 as chairman of a committee to agree on the design of an 18-foot one design dinghy for the Shannon Yacht Clubs which became known as the Shannon-One-Design.

Destruction
Growing tensions in Ireland ultimately led to the Irish War of Independence of 1919 – 1921. The effects of the war were felt in the Irish midlands as much as anywhere else in the country. In early July 1921, British military forces burned several homes in south Westmeath and, incensed, local Irish Republican Army (IRA) forces felt that this could not go unpunished. Moydrum Castle, given its status as the seat of a prominent member of the British House of Lords, was chosen as a suitably symbolic subject for their reprisals.  On the night of 3 July 1921, an assembly of IRA members marched on the castle.  The 5th Baron was out of Ireland at the time but his wife and daughter, together with several servants, were in residence and were woken from their sleep by knocking at the door.  The Baroness and her daughter were given time to gather together a few valuable belongings before the building was set alight. The blaze completely destroyed the castle.

Following the establishment of the Irish Free State, much of the land belonging to the Barony was improved, divided and sold on by the Irish Land Commission.  The Baron, his wife and family were never to return to Moydrum.

Photographer Anton Corbijn photographed Moydrum Castle for the cover of the Irish rock band U2's fourth studio album, 1984's The Unforgettable Fire and gave it a sepia tone.  The photograph, however, was a virtual copy of a picture on the cover of a 1980 book In Ruins: The Once Great Houses of Ireland by Simon Marsden, for which U2 had to pay compensation. It was taken from the same spot and used the same polarising filter technique, but with the addition of the four band members. This photo was shot with infrared photographic film giving the leaves a light tone and the blue sky a very dark tone.

Other Westmeath Castles
 Ballinlough Castle
 Clonyn Castle 
 Killua Castle
 Knockdrin Castle
 Tyrrellspass Castle
 Tullynally Castle

References

Castles in County Westmeath
Ruins in the Republic of Ireland
Ruined castles in Ireland